Fluclorolone acetonide (INN, or flucloronide, USAN, trade names Cutanit, Topicon) is a corticosteroid for topical use on the skin.

References 

Acetonides
Chloroarenes
Corticosteroid cyclic ketals
Corticosteroids
Fluoroarenes
Glucocorticoids